The Lake Havasu Unified School District is the school district headquartered in Lake Havasu City, Arizona. The superintendent is Rebecca Stone,PhD.

The district includes Lake Havasu, Crystal Beach, and Desert Hills.

High schools
 Lake Havasu High School

Middle schools (7–8)
 Thunderbolt

Elementary schools (K–6)
 Havasupai
 Jamaica
 Nautilus
 Oro Grande
 Smoketree
 Starline

References

External links
 

School districts in Mohave County, Arizona
Lake Havasu City, Arizona